Juventus F.C. finished second in Serie A this season.

Overview
The summer of 1993 saw the arrival of Angelo Di Livio from Padova, Andrea Fortunato from Genoa and Sergio Porrini from Atalanta. Departures from the club included Pierluigi Casiraghi, Paolo Di Canio and David Platt. 

Juventus finished second in Serie A to Milan, who would also win the 1993–94 UEFA Champions League. Although Roberto Baggio would finish as top scorer (in both Serie A and in total), the season was notable for the emergence of Alessandro Del Piero. Del Piero made his Serie A debut against Foggia on 12 September 1993 as a substitute, and he scored his first goal in his next match, against Reggiana on 19 September, after coming off the bench once again. On his full debut for Juventus, against Parma, he scored a hat-trick. The season also marked the end of the second spell in charge of Giovanni Trapattoni, who moved onto Bayern Munich in the summer of 1994. He was replaced by Marcello Lippi.

Squad

Transfers

Competitions

Serie A

League table

Results by round

Matches

Coppa Italia 

Second round

UEFA Cup

First round

Second round

Eightfinals

Quarterfinals

Statistics

Player Statistics

Squad Statistics

Goalscorers

References

Juventus F.C. seasons
Juventus